Bending the Rules (Persian: قاعده تصادف, romanized: Ghaedeye tasadof, meaning The Rule of Accident) is a 2013 Iranian drama film directed, written and produced by Behnam Behzadi. The film screened for the first time at the 31st Fajr International Film Festival and received 3 Awards and 3 nominations.

Cast 

 Neda Jebraeili as Shahrzad
 Amir Jafari as Shahrzad's Father
 Ashkan Khatibi as Amir
 Mehrdad Sedighian as Bardia
 Baharan Bani Ahmadi as Parisa
 Mohammad Reza Ghaffari as Mehrdad
 Elahe Hesari as Ladan
 Martin Shamoonpour as Martin
 Roshanak Gerami as Maryam
 Soroush Sehhat as Shahrzad's Uncle
 Omid Roohani as Parisa's Father
 Soroosh Malamir as Asad
 Ehsan Mahsouri

Reception

Accolades

References

External links 
 

2010s Persian-language films
Iranian drama films
2013 drama films